USS Pompano has been the name of more than one United States Navy ship, and may refer to: 

 , a supply boat in commission from 1917 to 1919
 , a submarine commissioned in 1937 and lost in 1943
 , a submarine canceled in 1945

See also
, a submarine commissioned in 1943 and now a museum ship in San Francisco 
, a submarine in commission from 1943 to 1946 and from 1953 to 1960

United States Navy ship names